The A.B. Graham House is a historic building in Clintonville, Columbus, Ohio. The 1.5-story Craftsman house was built in 1918 for Albert Belmont Graham. It was listed on the National Register of Historic Places in 2015.

See also
 National Register of Historic Places listings in Columbus, Ohio

References

Houses completed in 1918
National Register of Historic Places in Columbus, Ohio
Houses in Columbus, Ohio
Houses on the National Register of Historic Places in Ohio
Clintonville (Columbus, Ohio)